Mumbai–Ahmedabad High Speed Rail Corridor (MAHSR), or Mumbai–Ahmedabad HSR, is an under-construction high-speed rail line, which will connect India's economic and financial hub, Mumbai, with the capital of the state of Gujarat, Ahmedabad. When completed, it will be India's first high-speed rail line.

Construction was expected to begin by April 2020, and the project was expected to be completed by December 2023. Due to delays acquiring land in Maharashtra, a completion date for the whole corridor is uncertain, though the 352 km section through Gujarat will fully open in 2027, after opening the section's  stretch, from Surat to Bilimora, in August 2026.

History

Conception
The Mumbai–Ahmedabad corridor, along with five other high-speed rail corridors, was introduced for a feasibility study in the 2009–2010 Rail Budget. The point at which this route would touch Mumbai was to be decided when the feasibility report was prepared. The pre-feasibility study for the Ahmedabad–Mumbai–Pune corridor was completed by a consortium of RITES, Italferr and Systra. The proposed stations included Lonavala on Mumbai–Pune section and Surat, Bharuch and Vadodara on Mumbai–Ahmedabad section. It was proposed to have 32 services between Mumbai and Ahmedabad. Railway officials also proposed extending the corridor up to Bengaluru.

A Memorandum of Understanding (MoU) was signed in New Delhi on 14 February 2013 between the Ministry of Railways and the Société Nationale des Chemins de Fer Français (SNCF), the French national railways, for technical cooperation in the field of railways. The parties agreed to carry out jointly an "operations and development" feasibility project on the Mumbai–Ahmedabad high-speed rail corridor. The project was funded by the SNCF with support from the French Ministry of Finance. In March 2013, the Railway Board decided to drop the Mumbai–Pune section and operate the high-speed rail service only between Mumbai and Ahmedabad. The Board took the decision due to financial constraints, as the ghat section between Pune and Mumbai would escalate the budget for the project. According to Vidyadhar A. Malegaonkar, Chief Public Relations Officer (PRO), Western Railway, "It's basically a Western Railway project and very little portion of Maharashtra was being covered under it. Hence, the Maharashtra government was showing little interest in the project and was also reluctant to bear a financial burden. That is the reason why the Railway Board has decided against including the Pune–Mumbai portion in the high-speed corridor".

India and Japan signed a MoU to undertake a joint feasibility study of the Mumbai–Ahmedabad route in New Delhi in September 2013. This was in pursuance of the Joint Statement between the then-Prime Minister of India, Manmohan Singh and the Prime Minister of Japan, Shinzō Abe, on 29 May 2013, which provided that the two sides would co-finance a joint feasibility study of the route. The cost of the study (¥500 million) was borne equally by India and Japan. The study was scheduled to be completed within 18 months from its commencement, i.e. by July 2015. The study carried out traffic forecasting, alignment surveys and undertook a comparative Study of high-speed railway technology and systems.

Japan International Cooperation Agency (JICA) and the SNCF carried out studies on the project. JICA researched the technology, alignment and traffic-related aspects, while SNCF worked on business projections. The feasibility study included an alignment survey concerning aspects such as land acquisition, environmental challenges and building of tunnels and bridges. It also suggested a financial model based on fare and non-fare box revenue.

Planning
JICA officials visited Mumbai in January 2014 to discuss the details of the project, and made selective site visits to the proposed route. On 21 January, following several meetings between JICA and Indian Railways officials, it was proposed to originate the corridor at the Bandra Kurla Complex (BKC) in Mumbai. The proposed route would begin from BKC, go right up to Thane on the Central Line, and then take a diversion on the Trans-Harbour route which is on the Thane-Diva-Vasai-Virar stretch. The corridor would then switch over to the Western Line, before entering Gujarat and terminating at Ahmedabad. 12 stations were proposed on the route, of which 8 would have been in Gujarat. The intention behind taking the route via Thane is to keep the option open to link the corridor to Pune. The team also proposed other options for originating the line at either Bandra Terminus or Lokmanya Tilak Terminus, if the BKC option was unfeasible.

The project held its first full-fledged meeting at the Railway Ministry in the first week of April 2014, to bring about a broad consensus on the project, especially between the governments of Maharashtra and Gujarat. The meeting was attended by representatives from the Maharashtra and Gujarat governments, and the JICA, and Railway Board officials. At the meeting, officials agreed to begin the line from BKC, and then take it to Thane and onward to Virar. The Maharashtra government was in favour of connecting the line with Belapur as well, in order to bring high-speed rail to Navi Mumbai. However, railway officials were opposed to the Belapur detour. Officials also discussed the need to ensure that the terminal at BKC would be connected to Line 3 of the Mumbai Metro, enabling commuters from South Mumbai to reach BKC.

In May 2014, the project was approved by Prime Minister Narendra Modi in a meeting with the chairman of the High Speed Rail Corporation of India. The feasibility study on the project was carried out by RITES, Italferr and Systra in July 2015. On 20 July 2015, a joint Japanese-Indian survey team recommended a Shinkansen-style system for the Mumbai–Ahmedabad line, including the adoption of Automatic train control and dedicated tracks. JICA's report recommended constructing 63.3% of the route an embankment slightly above the ground, 28.3% on stilts, 5.8% underground and 2.2% on bridges. Minister of State for Railways Rajen Gohain informed Parliament on 15 March 2017 that under a new plan the entire corridor would be elevated except for the tracks that were proposed to be built underground.

The Ministry of Railways, based on the recommendation of the NITI Aayog, announced that Shinkansen technology would be adopted for the line, with technology transfer to support the Make in India programme. Japan would also provide staff training. In January 2016, the Ministry of Railways fast tracked the project and set up a Special Purpose Vehicle (SPV) named the National High Speed Rail Corporation Limited to build and operate the corridor. The company was registered in January 2016 in the name of Indian Railways. It was planned for the company to eventually be made into a joint venture with equity participation of the Maharashtra and Gujarat governments. The Public sector company is expected to build and also carry out train operations. The Ministry of Railways, the National High-Speed Rail Corporation (NHSRC) and JICA signed a tripartite consultancy agreement in December 2016 to implement the project. The NHSRC is a new agency floated to implement the project. A joint venture between Japan International Consultants for Transportation Co (JIC), Nippon Koei Co, and Oriental Consultants Global Co. Ltd. was appointed as the general consultants for the project, and prepared design documents, bidding documents and technical standards and specifications for the project.

In late 2016, JICA awarded the detailed design study for the project to a consortium led by Japan International Consultants for Transportation (JIC), Nippon Koei India Pvt. Ltd and Oriental Consultants. The study formally began in March 2017. JIC will forecast demand, set fares and devise a train operation plan, handle preliminary design work for structures such as tunnels and bridges, and draw up an overall construction schedule. Japan International Consultants for Transportation (JIC) Project Manager stated that "conditions surrounding the construction of a high-speed railway in India – such as weather, which is harsh there, and the quality and standards of materials – are considerably different from those in Japan. So we are now comparing and adjusting to these technical matters." Japanese public and private sector companies conducted training programs for railway staff in India. JIC stated that the local expertise in India gained from constructing and operating various rapid transit systems could be utilized for the high speed rail project. Japan also provided training to Indian Railway Ministry officials, some of whom studied in government-sponsored programs at graduate schools in Japan. India and Japan signed an agreement to establish an HSR Training Institute in India by 2020 to train railway staff in high speed rail operations.

The project received clearance from the National Board for Wildlife (NBWL) in January 2019 to carry out construction in and around wildlife areas. The Board required the NHSRC to create safe passages for animals to pass through before beginning construction, and to erect noise barriers and fencing to prevent any disturbance to wildlife during construction.

The project received conditional clearance to cut down 53,467 mangrove trees spread over an area of 13.36 hectares from the expert appraisal committee (EAC) on Coastal Regulation Zone (CRZ) projects of the Union Ministry of Environment and Forests on 18 March 2019. The Ministry required the NHSRCL to obtain approval from the Bombay High Court and clearance from the Dahanu Taluka Environment Protection Authority. The NHSCRL is also required to conduct a study on the impact of the vibrations from the trains on the birds and mudflats in the Thane Creek Flamingo Sanctuary. The NHSRCL approached the Bombay High Court for approval on 8 April 2019. The NHSRCL announced in June 2019 that it had altered the proposed design of Thane station which would save 21,000 mangrove trees. As a result, only 32,044 mangroves are affected by the project.

Design
The design for the bridges, viaducts and tunnels was made by engineers based in Delhi, Mumbai and Japan. A  tunnel connects Thane and Virar, of which  will be undersea. The undersea tunnel was chosen to avoid damaging the thick vegetation present in the area. The corridor will begin at the underground station in the Bandra-Kurla Complex in Mumbai, and then traverse  underground before emerging above ground at Thane.

Cost 
The project is estimated to cost , including the cost of 24 trainsets, interest during construction and import duties. JICA agreed to fund 81% of the total project cost , through a 50-year loan at an interest rate of 0.1% with a moratorium on repayments up to 15 years and the remaining cost will be borne by the state governments of Maharashtra and Gujarat. 20% of the components used on the corridor will be supplied by Japan, and manufactured in India.

Most of the line will be constructed on an elevated corridor to avoid land acquisitions and the need to build underpasses. It will also enhance safety by eliminating the need for level crossings. The decision to construct an elevated line raised the cost for the project by an additional .

Railway Minister Piyush Goyal informed Parliament that  had been spent on the project as of June 2019.

Land acquisition
Survey work on the route began in January 2017. According to NHSRC director Mukul Saran Mathur, "The geo-technical surveys have started along the entire route between Mumbai and Ahmedabad and is expected to take two to three months. The activities that have begun include geo-technical and geo-physical investigations into the 21-kilometre, under-water tunnel of the project as well as the Final Location Survey to mark the alignment, right down to the pillars on which the high speed trains will run." RITES identified 750 locations along the entire route to carry out soil testing, including 62 locations for the underground section. The agency completed soil testing at a total of 250 locations by 24 February. Officials carried out testing of soil and rocks at a depth of 70 metres underwater for the undersea tunnel stretch.

Railway officials utilized a helicopter mounted with a 100-megapixel high-resolution digital camera, a Light Detection and Ranging (LiDAR) scanner, a data recorder and other equipment to carry out the survey. This aerial-survey method provides accurate data about land contours, buildings and vegetation, and will permit the survey work to be completed within 9–10 weeks as opposed to the six to eight months required for a regular survey. The helicopter completed its survey of the entire route within a flying time of 30 hours, and the rest of the time is required for data processing. The aerial survey was completed by JICA and the Indian Railways by the end of February 2017. Railway Ministry officials stated in April 2017 that final location surveys had been completed, and that consultants to carry out environmental and social impact studies would be appointed within a few months.

Indian Prime Minister Narendra Modi and Japanese Prime Minister Shinzo Abe laid the foundation stone for the project in Ahmedabad on 14 September 2017. All geo-technical surveys and tests under the sea bed for the underground section were completed by December 2017. Civil construction of the corridor was expected to begin by June 2018, and the project was scheduled to be completed in 2023. The deadline was advanced to have the bullet train go on its first run on 15 August 2022 on the occasion of India's 75th Independence day. However, surveys and land acquisition for the project faced delays and disruptions due to protests by farmers, land owners, and members of the Maharashtra Navnirman Sena party, which opposes the bullet train project. The deadline to complete land acquisition was postponed from December 2018 to December 2019 as a result of the protests. Railway Minister Piyush Goyal stated in July 2019 that the project was expected to be completed by December 2023. In February 2020, Maharashtra Chief Minister Uddhav Thackeray called the project a "white elephant" and questioned whether anyone would  benefit from it. The Shiv Sena has also blocked land acquisition attempts causing delays to the project.

A total of 1,434.4 hectares of land will be required for the project including private, government, forest and railway land. The Railway Ministry stated that it had only been able to acquire 21.02 hectares or about 1.46% of the total land required for the project as of 18 December 2018. NHSRC officials stated on 16 January 2019 that they had received the consent for land acquisition from 61 out of the 104 villages in Maharashtra that were located along the proposed route. Officials in Gujarat stated that land acquisition was expected to be completed only by the end of 2019. As of May 2019, 60% of land acquisition in Gujarat was completed.

A report by news agency IANS quoted an unnamed NHSRC official as stating that 39% of the total land acquisition had been completed as of June 2019. The official stated that 471 of 940 hectares of land was acquired in Gujarat and 66 of 431 hectares in Maharashtra. In August 2019, Minister of State for Railways Suresh Angadi informed Parliament that 297 villages were located along the proposed route in Gujarat and 97% of land owners in the state had consented to land acquisition but the government was still facing challenges acquiring land in certain pockets of Maharashtra. NHSRC Managing Director Achal Khare stated that 45% of total land acquisition for the project was complete as of September 2019. The Gujarat High Court dismissed a batch of petitions filed by farmers challenging the acquisition of their lands for the project later in the same month.

On 29 January 2020, Railway Board Chairman VK Yadav stated that 47% of the total land required for the project had been acquired. Maharashtra had only acquired 101.04 hectares out of the total 432 hectares required for the project, with no land having been acquired in Mumbai as of February 2021. Gujarat had completed 94% of total land acquisition (901.86 of 956.15 hectares). Railway Minister Piyush Goyal stated that the project would not be completed by 2023 due to land acquisition delays in Maharashtra. He also confirmed that the Railways would proceed with the tendering process in Gujarat as the state had acquired 94% of required land.

In September 2021, the NHSRCL stated that it had acquired 30% of required land in Maharashtra, 97% in Gujarat and had completed land acquisition in Dadra and Nagar Haveli.

As of March 2022, Over 89% of required land has been acquired, 98% in Gujarat, 68% in Maharashtra, and 100% in Daman and Diu and Dadra and Nagar Haveli.

As of February 2023, over 100% of the land required in Maharashtra  has been acquired; with Bombay High Court rejecting an appeal by Godrej & Boyce against the acquisition of land, whereby the offered monetary compensation of Rs 264 crore (INR 2.64 billion) for the purchase of 39,252 sq m (9.69 acres) of corporate land was contested by Godrej on September 15, 2022.

Construction

The NHSRCL has divided the civil construction work of 508 km long Mumbai–Ahmedabad High Speed Rail project into 8 packages as given below:

Note: The civil contract C8 has been awarded to the joint-venture of SCC Infrastructure Ltd and VRS Construction Ltd.

The NHSCRL floated tenders for the construction of the undersea tunnel on 23 April 2019. A tender for works between Vadodara and Ahmedabad was floated in August 2019. In January 2021, the NHSRCL invited final bids for the construction of the Mumbai terminal. The agency floated tenders for construction of the Sabarmati depot in August 2021.
The NHSRCL reinvented tender for underground HSR station at BKC grounds , Mumbai on 22 August 2022. It has also reinvented tendor for India's longest undersea tunnel of 21 km on 23 September 2022.

The NHSRCL stated that construction work on the project would create 90,000 direct and indirect jobs, including more than 51,000 technician jobs. The NHSRCL announced that it had cast the first full height pier for the project near Vapi, Gujarat on 31 July 2021.

A Full Span Launching Equipment-Straddle Carrier and Girder Transporter was deployed for use in the project September 2021. The equipment was indigenously designed and manufactured at Larsen and Toubro's manufacturing facility in Kanchipuram, Tamil Nadu. Over 30 such machines will be used in the construction of the project.

Infrastructure and operations

Indian Railways proposes to operate two types of services on the corridor. A "Rapid Train" or express service with only two stops at Surat and Vadodara, and a slower service that stops at all stations. The "Rapid Train" would complete the journey in 2 hours and 7 minutes, while the slower service would take 2 hours and 58 minutes. In total, 70 daily services will be operated on the line, or 35 services in each direction with 3 services per hour during peak hours and 2 services per hour during off-peak hours. The Railways estimates that the high speed rail corridor will have a daily ridership of around 36,000 in 2023. Trains will operate between 6.00AM and midnight. Currently, a train journey from Mumbai to Ahmedabad takes 7 hours.

On 9 January 2017 at Vibrant Gujarat Summit, the Gujarat Government and the National High Speed Rail Corporation Limited (NHSRC) signed an MoU worth  for component manufacturing for the high speed rail corridor. The Gujarat Government will bear 25% of the total project cost and provide land for the project.

Rolling stock
Twenty-four red E5 Series Shinkansen trainsets will be procured to operate on the corridor, of which 6 are to be assembled in India. The trains will be modified to operate under Indian weather. Trains in Japan can withstand temperatures of up to 35 degrees celsius but the Indian trains will be able to operate at temperatures exceeding 50 degrees celsius; this can be achieved with the use of special cooling systems and air conditioners. Fine mesh dust filters will be fitted on air conditioners, blowers, and other important equipment on the Indian high speed trains to keep dust out. Another modification is the provision of extra space to store heavy luggage by removing a few seats from the last coach of each train.

Trains are proposed to have a length of between 10 and 16 coaches. Each train will have a passenger capacity of between 1,300 and 1,600 passengers. Trains will be equipped with multi-purpose rooms that contain foldable beds for feeding mothers and patients, and the rooms will also be fitted with mirrors and baggage racks.

Signaling and power
Signaling equipment and power systems for the corridor will be imported from Japan, per the terms of the loan agreement with JICA.

The NHSRCL estimated that the corridor would consume around  110 crore units of electricity annually once operational. Consumption was expected to rise in 2033, when additional services are planned to be introduced. A total of 29 substations will supply electricity to the corridor. The NHSRCL finalized the locations for the substations by January 2018, and approached power utility companies in Gujarat and Maharashtra to conduct joint surveys which were completed by April 2018. The NHSRCL acquired 39,540 square feet of land from the Godrej and Boyce Manufacturing Company at Vikhroli in May 2018 to construct the ventilation shaft and distribution and traction sub-stations for the corridor.

Solar panels installed at the Sabarmati and Thane stations, at the High-Speed Rail Training Institute in Vadodara, and at the Sabarmati HSR Complex will generate solar power.

Operator
The National High Speed Rail Corporation Limited (NHSRCL) was registered under the Companies Act, 2013 on 12 February 2016. The NHSRC is a special purpose vehicle responsible for the implementation of the Mumbai–Ahmedabad high-speed rail project. In October 2016, the Indian Railways invited applications to fill key positions in the NHSRC.

Fares
The detailed project report proposed fares that would be 1.5 times that of a First-Class AC ticket on the Mumbai–Ahmedabad Duronto Express. In September 2019, the NHSRCL stated that the end-to-end fare on the corridor was expected to be , and the minimum fare would be .

Trains will have business and standard sections with 2x2 and 2x3 seating configuration respectively. Unlike Japanese Shinkansen coaches, the last coach on Indian trains will have a few seats removed to make space to store check-in luggage. NHSRC Managing Director Achal Khare stated that Japanese passengers typically travel light but the modification was made to accommodate Indian passengers. The coaches have sufficient overhead space for hand baggage but not for heavy luggage. The NHSRC stated that it would charge passengers an additional fee for check-in luggage in order to discourage travellers from bringing too many pieces of heavy luggage. Passengers who travel with check-in luggage would be seated in the same coach in which check-in luggage is stored.

Depots
The corridor uses three depots at Sabarmati and Surat in Gujarat and Thane in Maharashtra. The depots were designed based on the operations at Japan's Sendai and Kanazawa depots for Shinkansen. The Sabarmati depot is spread over an area of 80 hectares and serves as the main depot for the line. It also houses the operation control centre for the corridor. The Thane depot is spread over an area of 60 hectares. The Sabarmati and Thane depots contain washing plants, inspection bays, sheds, workshops, and stabling lines for regular maintenance of trains. The Surat depot is the smallest with an area of 44 hectares. It contains basic facilities for train maintenance.

All depots contain reservoirs for rain water harvesting and collected water is passed through treatment plants within the depot before being re-used for washing trainsets. Depots also have recharge pits for recharging water back into the earth. The Thane and Surat depots are also capable of recycling and re-using effluent and sewage water. Bio-waste from the trains is stored in tanks onboard and removed at depots, where it is then treated in sewage treatment plants.

Stations
The line will have 12 stations. Stations are proposed for Mumbai, Thane, Virar, Boisar, Vapi, Bilimora, Surat, Bharuch, Vadodara, Anand/Nadiad, Ahmedabad and Sabarmati. High speed rail stations will be constructed either above or next to existing railway stations to provide transfer with the Indian Railways network. The Director of the Railway Bureau of Japan's Ministry of Land, Infrastructure, Transportation and Tourism stated that "this makes construction extremely difficult".

Mumbai terminal
The Indian Railways proposed making the proposed terminus at BKC as a three-storey underground station. However, the Maharashtra state government planned to construct the International Financial Services Centre (IFSC) at BKC on the same plot. JICA's report had cited the BKC plot as the most suitable location to build the Mumbai terminus. In February 2016, the Railways and the state government came to an agreement to construct both projects at the BKC. However, in April 2016, the state government refused to permit construction of the underground station at BKC, citing the lack of availability of land in the area for an underground station after the completion of the proposed IFSC and its multi-level underground car park. The state government also stated that IFSC would begin generating revenue for the government shortly, while the rail corridor was only expected to be completed by 2023. It instead suggested relocating the proposed BKC terminus to either Matunga or Kanjurmarg. The issue was resolved in January 2017, when the Maharashtra Government and the MMRDA agreed to provide 5.4 hectares of land in BKC to construct a terminus. Lines 2 and 3 of the Mumbai Metro will meet the HSR at BKC.

Vadodara
Platform 6 of the  will be used as the platform for the bullet train. The NHSRCL will revamp the existing station to accommodate high-speed rail services. This will involve the removal of the reservation center, section engineering office, water tank and railway police station located on the existing platform. The new station building will have a height of 20–22 metres, and will be 40 metres in width. The design of the station is inspired by the banyan tree. The project requires the dismantling of platform 7. The largest girder on the high-speed rail corridor, measuring 220 metres in length, will be located at Vadodara station. The construction of the girder will require the dismantling of platform 7 of Vadodara Junction station which is used by trains arriving from Delhi. To cope with the loss of the platform, the NHRSCL will build a new  as a satellite station. Chhayapuri station was inaugurated in December 2019, paving the way for officials to go ahead with the dismantling of platform 7 at Vadodara Junction.

Ahmedabad Terminal
The Sabarmati station will serve as the high-speed rail terminal in Ahmedabad. A new high speed rail terminal will be built on the eastern side of the station above the existing platforms 10, 11 and 12.

Extensions

Delhi–Ahmedabad HSR

The Delhi-Ahmedabad High-Speed Rail corridor (DAHSR) and the Mumbai–Ahmedabad high-speed rail corridor (MAHSR) will together form the Delhi-Mumbai high-speed rail corridor (DMHSR).

It will start from Dwarka Sector 21 in Delhi, run along the Dwarka Expressway till Gurugram, with its stop at Manesar, then along the Gurugram-Jaipur rail line to Rewari, and then along NH-48 to Jaipur till Sabarmati (the last stop of MAHSR).

Project status

2020
 July : 60% of required land was acquired and the rest was "almost on the verge of completion."
 October : Contract signed for 47% of the total length of the project. The contract awarded lies in the state of Gujarat.

2021
 February : Larsen and Toubro (L&T) begins Pier Work for Mumbai-Ahmedabad High Speed corridor.
 May : Larsen and Toubro (L&T) started pouring concrete to cast the first pier of Mumbai-Ahmedabad High Speed corridor.
 June : Newly appointed Railway Minister, Ashwini Vaishnaw reviewed the entire project. According to PTI report, 1,035 hectare had been acquired out of the total of 1,396 hectares of land required for the project. Out of the 74% land acquired till this date, the majority of 96% falls in Gujarat, while only 25% falls in the state of Maharashtra. Besides, 96% of the land needed for the project in Dadra and Nagar Haveli had already been acquired.
 July : National High Speed Rail Corporation Limited (NHSRCL) invites bids for design, construction, installation, testing and commissioning of Sabarmati Depot consisting of workshop, inspection sheds, various buildings, maintenance facilities and associated works. December 2, 2021 would be the last date for submission of bids.
 August : NHSRCL casts the first full height pier on Mumbai–Ahmedabad high-speed rail corridor. The exact height of the cast pier is 13.05 metres. The pier is cast with 183 cubic metres of concrete quantity and 18.820 MT of steel.
 September : On 10 September  Larsen and Toubro (L&T) made first indigenously designed and manufactured 'Full Span Launching Equipment-Straddle Carrier and Girder Transporter' to expedite the construction of viaduct for Mumbai- Ahmedabad High Speed Rail corridor. As of 29 September the  stretch from Surat to Bilimora is expected to be operational by 2026, while the rest of Gujarat's portion is expected to be completed by 2024.
 October : The joint venture of IRCON International and DRA Infracon won package C7 on 4 October comprising viaduct between Anand and Sabarmati, including 2 HSR stations at Sabarmati and Ahmedabad. NHSRCL then invited the bids for the tunnelling work on 21 kilometres underground, including a 7 kilometre long undersea tunnel, as of 30 October.
November
2 November: Casting of 970-tonne full span pre-stressed concrete (PSC) box girder launched at near Naslipore village, Navsari district, Gujarat.
25 November: NHSRCL erects first full span 40 m box girder for Mumbai-Ahmedabad HSR Corridor, near Navsari.
December: NHSRCL had acquired 40.39% of the total land required for the project in Maharashtra. It was said that the construction work would not commence until 80-90% of the land is acquired. While in the case of Gujarat, 98.5% of the land was acquired.

2022
January :
 18 January : 46.71% of the total land required in the state of Maharashtra was acquired by NHSRCL from districts of Palghar and Thane. The land in the suburbs of Mumbai as well as 4.82 hectares of land in Bandra Kurla Complex was yet to be acquired.
 21 January : First track contract signed by NHSRCL with contractor IRCON International to design, supply and construct the tracks. Two Japanese companies namely, Japanese Railway Track Consultants (JRTC) and Japanese Railway Technical Service (JARTS) work closely with IRCON. This contract covers about 47% of the total length of the project starting from Maharashtra- Gujarat Border to Vadodara in Gujarat.
 23 January : According to a Media report, around 13 kilometres of Pier work had been completed and another stretch of piling-up or casting was in the process.
February :
 3 February : The land acquisition was almost completed in Gujarat with 99.4% of the total land being acquired. Out of 736 hectares of land that was to be acquired in Gujarat, only 6.6 hectares of land was pending. In Maharashtra, land acquisition was nearly 60% complete. However, the important lands in suburban Mumbai were yet to be acquired.
 9 February : NHSRCL awarded ₹ 2,460.88 worth of contract for L&T to design and develop 8 km of the viaduct and a station in Vadodara. This marked the successful awarding of 100% civil contracts for the construction of alignments in Gujarat, including eight stations and two rolling stock depots at Sabarmati and Surat respectively.
 June: 
 6 June: Around 90.3% of the total required land (98.78% of the land required in Gujarat, and 71.49% in Maharashtra) has been acquired. First train is expected to run, on a 50 km (31 mi) section, between Surat and Bilimora, in 2026.
July:
15 July: Maha govt clears issues related to land acquisition. The newly formed government has directed the officials to resolve all the issues including transfer of land for underground station and tunnel shaft by September. 
 25 July: Japan awards ₹6000 Crores ODA loan for the project.
 September:
22 September 2022: About 96 percent of land needed for MAHSR project acquired in state of Maharashtra . NHSRCL has got possession of 71% land in state. The works in the state are slated to start by 2022 end.
 October
9 October 2022: As of now about 6.7 km of viaduct is completed, piles cast on 183.3 km , foundation over 104.3 km and piers over a stretch of 93 km in state of Gujarat.
December
15 December 2022: As of now of the total land acquired for the project is  1,374.20 Ha out of the required  1,392.63 Ha. Which is about 98.68%.In Gujarat, 943.53 Ha out of 954.3 Ha has been acquired, accounting for 98.87% of the total land required in the state. In Dadra and Nagar Haveli, the entire 7.90 Ha land and in Maharashtra, 422.77 Ha out of 430.45 Ha (98.2%) has been acquired.

2023
January
25 January 2023: The first rail level slabs of 50 meters  have been placed at Surat high-speed railway station. Girder laying work on a 27.6 km-long section that includes 6.28 km of continuous viaduct near Vadodara and remaining at different locations have been done so far.
February
18 February 2023: Pile work: 242.18 km, Pier work: 140.68 km, 36.24 km Girders launched and 320 m long, first river bridge on Par River is completed.
March
14 March: 257.06 km of pile work completed, 155.48 km of pier work completed, and 37.64 km of girders launched. Overall progress has been 26.3%, out of which the Gujarat section from Surat to Bilimora will be opened by August 2026, while that entire section will be opened by 2027.

See also

References

External links
 Preliminary Study 
 India's first bullet train project launched, by Respected PM Narendra Modi calls it New India's big dream
 OpenStreetMap with route of Mumbai–Ahmedabad high-speed rail corridor；Permanent link

High-speed railway lines in India
Standard gauge railways in India
Rail transport in Maharashtra
Rail transport in Gujarat
Proposed railway lines in India
Modi administration initiatives
Rail transport in Mumbai
Transport in Ahmedabad
India–Japan relations
2028 in rail transport